The Road to Reno is an American screwball comedy film starring Randolph Scott and Hope Hampton.

Cast
 Randolph Scott as Steve Fortness
 Hope Hampton as Linda Halliday
 Glenda Farrell as Sylvia Shane
 Helen Broderick as Aunt Minerva
 Alan Marshal as Walter Crawford
 David Oliver as Salty
 Ted Osborne as Linda's Attorney
 Samuel S. Hinds as Sylvia's Attorney
 Charles Murphy as Mike
 Spencer Charters as The Judge
 Dot Farley as Mrs. Brumleigh (as Dorothy Farley)
 Mira McKinney as Hannah
 Renie Riano as Woman Bailiff
 Lita Chevret as Gladys
 Willie Fung as Lame Duck
 Jack Rube Clifford as Trucker

External links

American black-and-white films
American romantic comedy films
American screwball comedy films
Films based on short fiction
Films directed by S. Sylvan Simon
Universal Pictures films
Films based on works by I. A. R. Wylie
Films with screenplays by F. Hugh Herbert
1938 comedy films
1938 films
1930s American films